Everhardus "Edu" Snethlage (5 November 1883 in Ngawi, Dutch East Indies – 12 January 1941 in Medan, Dutch East Indies) was a Dutch association football player. He was a member of the Dutch team that won the bronze medal in the football tournament of the 1908 Summer Olympics.

Snethlage became the all-time top scorer for the Dutch national team on 21 March 1909. His opening goal of the match against Belgium was his seventh goal for the Netherlands, breaking the record of six goals that Eddy de Neve had held since 14 May 1905. Snethlage improved his record by scoring three goals against Belgium on 25 April 1909. His record would stand until 16 October 1910, when Jan Thomée scored his eleventh goal for the Netherlands in a match against Germany.

References

External links
profile

1883 births
1941 deaths
Dutch footballers
Footballers at the 1908 Summer Olympics
Olympic footballers of the Netherlands
Olympic bronze medalists for the Netherlands
Netherlands international footballers
Olympic medalists in football
People from Ngawi Regency
Medalists at the 1908 Summer Olympics
Association football forwards
H.V. & C.V. Quick players
Dutch people of the Dutch East Indies